Gilbert Marquis (28 July 1923 – January 1983) was a Swiss racewalker. He competed in the men's 50 kilometres walk at the 1952 Summer Olympics.

References

External links
 

1923 births
1983 deaths
Athletes (track and field) at the 1952 Summer Olympics
Swiss male racewalkers
Olympic athletes of Switzerland
Place of birth missing